Edmund Rice Education Australia (EREA) is the organisation established by the Congregation of Christian Brothers in Australia to own, govern, manage and conduct education ministries in the Catholic tradition and in the charism of Blessed Edmund Ignatius Rice. , EREA included 55 member schools.

EREA was established on 1 October 2007 when the Christian Brothers decided to amalgamate separate Christian Brothers provinces in Australia, New Zealand and Papua New Guinea to form an Oceania Province that was solely focused on the social justice mission of the Christian Brothers. The Christian Brothers' National Planning Committee for Schools Governance decided to form a separate body, Edmund Rice Education Australia, with the intention of independently implementing the educational mission of the Christian Brothers.

Governance 
Council
Comprising five people, the Council is the body ultimately responsible for the governance of EREA. In civil law, the Council constitutes the Trustees of Edmund Rice Education Australia. 

Board
Comprising eight people, the Board is appointed by the EREA Council.

Educational institutions

Australia 
The national office for EREA is located in Richmond, Victoria. Member schools agree to the Charter for Catholic Schools in the Edmund Rice tradition which was first used in 2004 and revised in 2011 to include four primary Touchstones. , EREA included 55 schools, 4,500 staff, and over 39,000 students. In addition, in 2016 EREA established the Flexible Schools Networks, a network of 22 educational institutions across Australia that provide inclusive and non-discriminating learning opportunities.

New Zealand 
Although not controlled by EREA, there are several partner schools united within the tradition of Edmund Rice:

 Kavanagh College, Dunedin 
 Liston College, Waitakere 
 St Kevin's College, Omaru 
 St Peter's College, Auckland 
 St Thomas of Canterbury College, Christchurch

Papua New Guinea 

 Fatima College, Banz, Western Highlands Province
 St Francis Xavier Post Primary School, Bundralis, Manus Province

See also 

 Catholic education in Australia
 Edmund Ignatius Rice
 Edmund Rice Camps
 Edmund Rice Schools Trust (Ireland)
 List of Christian Brothers schools

References 

Religious organisations based in Australia
 
2007 establishments in Australia
Organisations based in Melbourne